Church and State may refer to:

General uses
 Separation of church and state
 Church and state in medieval Europe
 Relations between the Catholic Church and the state
 Religion in politics
 State religion, or established religion or official religion

Particular uses
 Church and State (comics), a novel by Dave Sim in the Cerebus comic book series
 Church and State (Tolstoy book), 1882
 Church & State, newsletter of Americans United for Separation of Church and State 
 Church and State Gazette, an English weekly newspaper 1842–1856
 Journal of Church and State, an academic journal 
 "Church and State", an episode of Our Cartoon President

See also